The Ex-Mrs. Bradford is a 1936 American comedy-mystery film. William Powell and Jean Arthur star as a divorced couple who investigate a murder at a racetrack. This was the last film directed by Stephen Roberts before his untimely death from a heart attack.

The similarity between RKO's The Ex-Mrs. Bradford and M-G-M's The Thin Man (1934) and was speculated about given the chances that RKO's film would eclipse After the Thin Man (1936), which was to be released later in the year, at the box office. Modern sources claim that the film was RKO's third most successful production of 1936.

Plot
Wealthy murder mystery writer Paula Bradford (Jean Arthur) returns from her worldwide travels to see her former husband, surgeon Dr. Lawrence "Brad" Bradford (William Powell). He had divorced her because she was always involving him in real-life murder cases, but she wants him back. When a jockey riding the favorite dies while leading a race, she is convinced it was murder. She and Mike North (Frank M. Thomas), the horse's trainer, persuade the reluctant doctor to investigate. Brad is puzzled when he finds traces of gelatin on the corpse.

Then he receives an envelope at home addressed to North. North telephones a little later to say he sent it and will come pick it up. Someone claiming to be North calls shortly afterward and instructs Brad to meet him somewhere else, but without the money. Curious, Brad opens the envelope to find a great deal of money and replaces it with some torn up magazine pieces. Suspicious, Brad takes a taxi, but gets out a short distance away and returns to his suite. As he anticipated, a burglar is inside looking for the envelope. When the two men start fighting, Paula tries to help using a skull she picks up, but ends up knocking out Brad instead, allowing the intruder to get away.

Soon after, the doorbell rings. When Brad opens the door, North's body falls in. Police Inspector Corrigan (James Gleason) names Brad as the main suspect in the second death. Now Brad has to solve both murders to clear himself.

All sorts of suspects present themselves: Nick Martel (Robert Armstrong), a bookie who owed North $125,000 for a winning bet; Leroy Hutchins (Ralph Morgan), the owner of the winning horse; John Summers (Grant Mitchell), the favorite's owner; Mrs. Summers, who is seeing Martel behind her husband's back; and Summer's lawyer, Henry Strand (an uncredited Frank Reicher). 

Even Brad's receptionist, Miss Prentiss (Lila Lee), had been spotted with Martel. Brad discovers that North made the bet through someone else and Martel was instructed to send the money to an address he was given, but decided to confront North in person instead over what he considered to be deceit; though North claimed he did not place the bet, Martel did not believe him and gave him the money. 

Going to the address provided, Brad finds Paula already there. They then discover the body of Lou Pender (Paul Fix), the would-be burglar who had masqueraded as North, in a Murphy bed after he kills a spider. As Brad is examining the corpse, an unseen person shoots at him from the window. He is not seriously wounded.

Brad eventually figures out how the murders were committed. The killer put a deadly black widow spider inside a gelatin capsule, secretly attached it to the victim's body, and waited for the gelatin to melt from body heat, releasing the spider. 

Since the police have the $125,000, Brad assumes the killer will try the same trick again. The same two horses are scheduled to race against each other the next day, so Brad has film cameras set up around the racetrack. The murderer does strike again, but Brad had taken the precaution of inoculating the jockey beforehand.

Brad invites all of the suspects to his suite, hoping the culprit will stay away. When that fails, he screens the film footage he had taken. It shows Mr. Summers slipping a capsule down the jockey's back. 
Pulling out a gun, Summers admits his motive was revenge against his unfaithful wife and Martel. 

Brad subdues him before he can shoot the lovers. During the struggle, however, Paula accidentally knocks out her ex-husband with a vase. Despite this, the couple remarry.

Cast

 William Powell as Dr. Lawrence Bradford
 Jean Arthur as Paula Bradford
 James Gleason as Inspector Corrigan
 Eric Blore as Stokes, Bradford's butler
 Robert Armstrong as Nick Martel
 Lila Lee as Miss Prentiss
 Grant Mitchell as John Summers
 Erin O'Brien-Moore as Mrs. Summers
 Ralph Morgan as Leroy Hutchins
 Lucile Gleason as Mrs. Hutchins
Uncredited (in order of appearance)

Reception
The film was very popular and earned a profit of $350,000.

References

External links
 
 
 
 

1936 films
American romantic comedy films
American black-and-white films
Films directed by Stephen Roberts
American horse racing films
RKO Pictures films
1936 romantic comedy films
1930s comedy mystery films
American comedy mystery films
1930s American films